Henna Lindholm (born 4 May 1989) is a Finnish former ice dancer. With partner Ossi Kanervo, she is the 2012 Nordic champion, the 2014 Bavarian Open bronze medalist, and a three-time Finnish national champion.

Lindholm was a single skater until the age of 18, when she began training with Kanervo in ice dancing. They qualified for the free dance at the 2014 European Championships and finished 20th. They retired from competitive skating on May 13, 2015.

Programs 
(with Kanervo)

Competitive highlights 
(with Kanervo)

CS: Challenger Series (began in the 2014–15 season)

References

External links 

 
 Henna Lindholm / Ossi Kanervo at sport-folio.net
 Henna Lindholm / Ossi Kanervo at Tracings

1989 births
Finnish female ice dancers
Living people
Sportspeople from Helsinki